Swarzewo  is a village in the administrative district of Gmina Puck, within Puck County, Pomeranian Voivodeship, in northern Poland. It is located on the Bay of Puck within the historic region of Pomerania.

The village has a population of 988.

History

Swarzewo was a royal village of the Polish Crown, administratively located in Puck County in the Pomeranian Voivodeship.

During the German occupation of Poland (World War II), Swarzewo was one of the sites of executions of Poles, carried out by the Germans in 1939 as part of the Intelligenzaktion, and in 1942 the Germans expelled several Polish families, whose farms were then handed over to German colonists as part of the Lebensraum policy. The expelled Poles were enslaved as forced labour to serve Germans in other villages in the region.

References

Populated coastal places in Poland
Villages in Puck County